Tatishchevo is a military airbase in the Tatishchevsky District of Saratov Oblast, Russia. It is operated by Strategic Rocket Forces of Russia (RVSN).

The airbase serves the special helicopter squadron of RVSN (Mil Mi-8).

It has missiles silos with UR-100N and RT-2PM2 ICBMs.

References

Airports built in the Soviet Union
Airports in Saratov Oblast
Military airbases
Military installations of Russia